PSGA may refer to:

 Puneet Shikha Gupta & Associates, Chartered Accountants in Delhi, India
 Pedal Steel Guitar Association, United States association
 Polymer Stud Grid Array, a chip scale package